Sir John Thursby Community College is a mixed 11-16 comprehensive school in Burnley, Lancashire, England. It is named for Sir John Hardy Thursby (1826-1901), a local benefactor. It shares its site with Ridgewood Community High, a special school with places for 90 students.

History
The school opened in September 2006 as part of a plan to replace all of the district's 11-16 schools, funded by a government public–private partnership programme called Building Schools for the Future. It was formed from the merger of the former Barden High School and Walshaw High School, and occupies the former Walshaw site. Elaine Dawson, who had been the head of Walshaw since 2004, became the new school's first head teacher.

Former schools
Barden High School was a boys comprehensive school with only approximately 350 pupils in 2002.

Walshaw High School was a girls high school with about 800 pupils and has been described as "a successful and flourishing school".

New building
The School originally operated from the former Walshaw building, however in 2009 the schools moved a new £33M complex on the same site, with the former Walshaw building subsequently being demolished and new playing fields made in its place. In January 2011, David Burton replaced Elaine Dawson as head teacher.

Attainment

In 2007, the school's value-added measure was 987.5 (national average 1000).

Notable former pupils

Barden High School

 Paul Abbott, television screenwriter, creator of Shameless.
 Shahid Malik, politician.
 Craig Heap, Commonwealth Games Gold Medal-winning gymnast.
 Jay Rodriguez, footballer.

Walshaw High School
 Maya Vaja, radio presenter.

References

Schools in Burnley
Educational institutions established in 2006
Secondary schools in Lancashire
Foundation schools in Lancashire
2006 establishments in England